Myron Mendes is an Indian professional footballer who plays as a defender for Gokulam Kerala in the I-League. Besides India, he has played for ASD Cape Town in South Africa.

Career

Bengaluru FC
Mendes made his professional debut against Transport United in 2018 AFC Cup qualifiers. Mendes made his Indian Super League against Jamshedpur in 5-1 defeat on 27 February 2019.

Gokulam Kerala
Mendes joined I-League side Gokulam Kerala in 2019–20 season.

Career statistics

References

External links 
 Indian Super League profile.

Living people
Indian footballers
India youth international footballers
Bengaluru FC players
Association football defenders
Footballers from Goa
I-League 2nd Division players
Indian Super League players
I-League players
Indian expatriate footballers
Year of birth missing (living people)